Michael Kanin (February 1, 1910 – March 12, 1993) was an American director, producer, playwright and screenwriter who shared an Academy Award with Ring Lardner Jr. for writing the Katharine Hepburn-Spencer Tracy film comedy Woman of the Year (1942).

Born in Rochester, New York, his first job was writing and acting in Catskills resort shows with his brother Garson Kanin. In 1939, he was signed to a screenwriting contract at RKO. He married RKO co-worker Fay Mitchell in 1940, and collaborated with her on many projects including the Broadway play Goodbye, My Fancy (1948), the western The Outrage (1964), based on the Japanese film Rashomon (1950). The couple received an Academy Award nomination for Teacher's Pet (1958).

References

External links

Fay and Michael Kanin Collection via Academy of Motion Picture Arts and Sciences

1910 births
1993 deaths
Best Original Screenplay Academy Award winners
Jewish American screenwriters
Burials at Hollywood Forever Cemetery
Kanin family
20th-century screenwriters